211th Division may refer to:

 211th Division (People's Republic of China)
 211th Infantry Division (Wehrmacht)
 211th Rifle Division

Military units and formations disambiguation pages